Giulio Bonnard (21 June 1885 – 29 February 1972) was an Italian composer of film scores. He often worked on films directed by his brother Mario Bonnard.

Selected filmography
 Five to Nil (1932)
 Three Lucky Fools (1933)
 Stadium (1934)
 The Wedding March (1934)
 Territorial Militia (1935)
 Thirty Seconds of Love (1936)
 The Ferocious Saladin (1937)
 The Last Days of Pompeo (1937)
 The Count of Brechard (1938)
 A Lady Did It (1938)
 I, His Father (1939)
 Frenzy (1939)
 Father For a Night (1939)
 The King's Jester (1941)
 Marco Visconti (1941)
 The Prisoner of Santa Cruz (1941)
 Before the Postman (1942)
 After Casanova's Fashion (1942)
 The Peddler and the Lady (1943)
 What a Distinguished Family (1945)
 Romulus and the Sabines (1945)
 City of Pain (1948)
 Il voto (1950)
 Margaret of Cortona (1950)
 The Last Sentence (1951)
 I figli non si vendono (1952)
 Frine, Courtesan of Orient (1953)
 Concert of Intrigue (1954)
 Allow Me, Daddy! (1956)

References

Bibliography
 Piero Pruzzo & Enrico Lancia. Amedeo Nazzari. Gremese Editore, 1983.

External links

1885 births
1972 deaths
Italian composers
Musicians from Rome